The Dog Writers Association of America was established as the Dog Writers Association on February 13, 1935, at a meeting at the Westminster Kennel Club in New York. Beginning with eight dues-paying members, it gathered dog writers (i.e. the journalists, sportswriters, or others who covered dog shows for the sports pages of newspapers), and obtained amenities and recognition for them at dog shows. In 2010, the association claimed 600 members, and stated as part of its mission to encourage quality writing about dog sports and dog companionship. It does this through an annual writing competition with various awards such as the Maxwell Medallion and Merial Human-Animal Bond Award, which are awarded at an annual dinner on the eve of the Westminster Kennel Club Dog Show.

Awards

Merial Human-Animal Bond Award
2005 - Letters from Wolfie

References 

Journalism-related professional associations
1935 establishments in New York (state)
Organizations established in 1935
Dog organizations